World Festival of Animated Film Zagreb, also known as Animafest Zagreb, is a film festival entirely dedicated to animated film held annually in Zagreb, Croatia. Initiated by the International Animated Film Association (ASIFA), the event was established in 1972. Animafest is the second oldest animation festival in the World, after the Annecy International Animated Film Festival (established in 1960).

The idea to create the event came about because of the worldwide acclaim of animated shorts produced by authors belonging to the Zagreb School of Animated Films in the 1950s and 1960s. Zagreb's candidacy for holding a permanent animated film festival was accepted at the 1969 ASIFA meeting in London.

Festival awards include prizes given in the Short film Competition, Feature film Competition, Student Film Competition, Children Films, Site-specific competition and Croatian competition. Its Prize for "Best First Production Apart from Educational Institutions" is named in honour of Zlatko Grgić. The Lifetime Achievement Award, which is unique for animation film festivals, was established in 1986. An award for outstanding contribution to the theory of animation was added in 2002.

Grand Prize winners
From 1972 to 2004 Animafest was a biennial event focused on animated short films, held every even year with the exception of 1976.
Between 2005 and 2015 a feature film festival edition was introduced and held every odd year in between the short film editions.
In 2015 the shorts and feature selections were merged into one event, scheduled to be held every year.

Short films

Notes
× Oscar winner
≠ Oscar nominee

Feature films

Notes
× Oscar winner
≠ Oscar nominee

Footnotes

A.  In 1976 the festival was cancelled because of the earlier agreement that the three main ASIFA-sponsored festivals (at Annecy, Zagreb and Mamaia, Romania) would be held in three-year cycles, with Mamaia scheduled to take place in 1976. However, Romanian organizers cancelled the event at the last minute. In 1977 the regular festival at Annecy was held and the usual biennial cycle resumed, with Zagreb and Annecy taking turns.
B.  Although Animafest was held in 1982 and 1986, no Grand Prizes were awarded in these two editions.
C.  Animafest 2020 edition was held live in Zagreb, but due to coronavirus pandemic restrictions, it was decided for an edition without a Feature Film Competition.

Lifetime Achievement Award laureates

Award for outstanding contribution to animation studies laureates

See also

 List of animation awards
Other ASIFA-sponsored animated film festivals:
Annecy International Animated Film Festival (est. 1960)
Ottawa International Animation Festival (est. 1976)
Hiroshima International Animation Festival (est. 1985)

References

External links
Official website
Zagreb World Festival of Animated Films at the Internet Movie Database

Animation film festivals
Film festivals established in 1972
Film festivals in Croatia
Culture in Zagreb
Animation awards
Croatian animation
Festivals in Yugoslavia
1972 establishments in Croatia